Neeraj Chaturvedi is an Indian politician and a former member of Uttar Pradesh Legislative Assembly three times. He is an active member of the Bhartiya Janata Party. He represented Generalganj Constituency of Kanpur city in Uttar Pradesh legislative Assembly from 1991 to 2002. He is also a member of the Executive Committee of BJP Uttar Pradesh.

References

Living people
Bharatiya Janata Party politicians from Uttar Pradesh
Politicians from Kanpur
Members of the Uttar Pradesh Legislative Assembly
1952 births